Mangalam  is a coastal village in Tirur Taluk, Malappuram district, Kerala, India. Kootayi, known for its picturesque beach, is an important town in the jurisdiction of Mangalam Grama Panchayat.

History
Mangalam was a part of the Vettathunad in the medieval period, like most of the other villages in the Tirur Taluk. Vettathunad, also known as the Kingdom of Tanur, was a coastal city-state kingdom in the Malabar Coast. It was ruled by the Vettathu Raja, who was a dependent of the Zamorin of Calicut. Vettathunad was known for its trade relationship with the Arab merchants in the medieval period. The Kshatriya family of the Vettathu Rajas became extinct with the death of the last Raja on 24 May 1793. It was a part of the Malabar District during the British rule. Vallathol Narayana Menon, a renowned Malayalam poet, was born at Mangalam. The family of Mohammed Abdur Rahiman also traces back to here.

Mangalam Grama Panchayat, the local administrative body of the region, was formed on 30 September 2000 by bifurcating the Vettom Grama Panchayath.

Geography
The Tirur River, which flows through the village, divides the village into two parts - the coastal Kootayi on the western part and the Mangalam-Chennara town on the eastern part. Kootayi is better known for its beach and is one of the major fishing centres in the district. Mangroves are seen in the coastal area.

Demography
, Mangalam had a population of 33,442 with 15,754 males and 17,688 females. The literacy rate of the village in 2011 was 91.51%. Malayalam is the most spoken language. Mangalam has been a multi-ethnic and multi-religious town since the early medieval period.

Transportation
Almost every train stops here.
 Road: Mangalam is well connected to the other cities by road through the Tirur town. There are regular buses plying between Tirur and cities like Malappuram, Kozhikode, Ernakulam, Guruvayur, Thrissur, Kochi, Trivandrum, Alappuzha, Kottayam, Coimbatore, Banglore and all major cities. There are a few private buses offering over night journey to Bangalore.

Civic administration
The region is administered by the Mangalam Grama Panchayat. It is composed of 20 wards.  The Panchayat is bounded by Vettom and Thalakkad to the north, Triprangode to the east, Purathur to the south and Arabian Sea to the west. Hajara Majeed of IUML was the last president, and A. K. Saleem who belongs to Congress was the vice-president in the Panchayat. Mangalam comes under Thavanur (State Assembly constituency), which comes under the Ponnani (Lok Sabha constituency).
{ "type": "ExternalData",  "service": "geoshape",  "ids": "Q13113759"}

Law and Order 
The Mangalam village comes under the jurisdiction of Tirur Police Station, which started functioning on 1 May 1963. T. P. Farshad is the present Inspector of the Tirur police station.

Notable people
 Vallathol Narayana Menon
 Mohammed Abdur Rahiman (the roots of his family comes to Mangalam)

See also
Chamravattam
Ponnani
Purathur
Tirur
Triprangode
Vettom

References

External links

Cities and towns in Malappuram district
Tirur area